Viktor Vladimirovich Yerofeyev (also transliterated as Erofeyev; born 19 September 1947 in Moscow) is a Russian writer. As son of a high-ranking Soviet diplomat Vladimir Yerofeyev, he spent some of his childhood in Paris, which accounts for why much of his work has been translated from Russian into French, while comparatively little has been translated into English. His father, who was the interpreter for Molotov in the 1940s, wrote a book of memories; his brother is a curator at the Tretyakov Gallery.

Biography 
Erofeyev graduated from Moscow State University in 1970, where he studied literature and languages. He then did post-graduate work at the Institute for World Literature in Moscow, where he completed his post-graduate work in 1973 and received his kandidat degree in 1975 for his thesis on Fyodor Dostoyevsky and French existentialism. Erofeyev's work often contains pastiches of Dostoyevsky's work and themes.

He became a literary critic, publishing works on Lev Shestov and the Marquis de Sade. He later organised his own literary magazine, Metropol,  in which many of the big names of Soviet literature participated, including Vasily Aksyonov, Andrei Bitov, Bella Akhmadulina, and others. The magazine was put into circulation via samizdat, i.e., avoiding Soviet censorship. As a result, Erofeyev was expelled from the Union of Soviet Writers and was banned from being published until 1988, when Mikhail Gorbachev came to power.

Victor Erofeyev resided in Moscow until 2022 and frequently appeared on Russian television, where he had his own program on the TV channel «Kultura» ("culture"); he was also a continual guest on a Radio Liberty, Moscow.

Following the Russian invasion of Ukraine in 2022 he and his family fled Russia to settle in Germany.

Alfred Schnittke's opera Life with an Idiot is based on Erofeyev‘s story of the same name, which he made into a libretto for the composer.

The 2012 Finnish documentary movie "Russian Libertine" is centered on Victor Erofeyev and his view of the protests leading up to the 2012 Russian Presidential election.

On 3 October 2013, Victor Erofeyev received the Chevalier of Legion of Honour title from the French Government.

Major works
 Life with an Idiot («Жизнь с идиотом»; a collection of short stories; 1980)
 Russian Beauty («Русская красавица»; 1990)
 In the Labyrinth of Accursed Questions («В лабиринте проклятых вопросов»; a collection of essays; 1996)
 The Last Judgement («Страшный суд»; 1996)
 Five Rivers of Life («Пять рек жизни»; 1998)
 Encyclopaedia of the Russian Soul («Энциклопедия русской души»; 1999)
 Men («Мужчины»; 1997; in Russian) and God X («Бог X. Рассказы о любви»; 2001)
 The Good Stalin («Хороший Сталин»; 2004)

Journalism
Erofeyev also regularly contributes his articles to The Times Literary Supplement, The New Yorker, The New York Review of Books, and The International Herald Tribune.

References 

 Viktor Jerofejew, "Putins Russland hat ein Image-Problem" (Die Welt, 13 February 2007)

External links
Q & A in The Independent with Victor Erofeyev about Russian Beauty

Bibliography
Andrew Reynolds, "East is East...? Victor Erofeyev and the Poetics/Politics of Idiocy."
Reynolds is the translator of Life with an Idiot, first published by Penguin in English in 2004. .

1947 births
Living people
Russian critics
Russian journalists
Russian male novelists
Russian male short story writers
Moscow State University alumni
Chevaliers of the Légion d'honneur